Wenderson Rodrigues do Nascimento Galeno (born 21 October 1997), commonly known as Galeno or Wenderson Galeno, is a Portuguese-Brazilian professional footballer who plays as a winger for Portuguese club FC Porto.

He spent most of his career in Portugal, playing over 100 Primeira Liga games in two spells at Porto and for Braga, as well as loans at Portimonense and Rio Ave.

Club career

Early career
Born in Barra do Corda, Maranhão, Galeno joined Trindade's youth setup in 2014. He made his senior debut for the club on 10 February 2016, playing the last 29 minutes and scoring a brace in a 3–0 away defeat of Atlética Anapolina for the Campeonato Goiano championship.

Galeno finished the 2016 Campeonato Goiano with five goals in ten appearances, being named the Best Newcomer of the competition. In April 2016, he signed a contract with Grêmio Anápolis.

Porto
On 28 June 2016, Galeno moved abroad and joined Porto on a one-year loan deal, being initially assigned to the B-team in Segunda Liga. He made his professional debut on 7 August, starting in 2–1 away loss against C.D. Aves.

Galeno scored his first goal abroad on 20 August 2016, netting the winner in a 2–1 away success over neighbours Leixões. The following 16 May, after scoring 11 goals for the B's, he was bought outright by the Dragons, signing a five-year deal with a €40 million release clause.

Galeno made his first team – and Primeira Liga – debut for Porto on 21 October 2017, coming on as a late substitute for Moussa Marega in a 6–1 home routing of Paços de Ferreira. Three days later he made his first start in the group stage of the Taça da Liga, a goalless draw with Leixões also at the Estádio do Dragão.

On 23 January 2018, Galeno was presented at fellow top tier side Portimonense, on loan until June. He returned to Porto in July, after contributing with seven appearances, only one start.

Galeno was loaned to another club in the main category on 11 July 2018, Rio Ave, for the entire upcoming season. He made his European debut 15 days later away to Jagiellonia Białystok in the UEFA Europa League second qualifying round, and on 2 August scored twice in the first half of the second leg, a 4–4 home draw that saw his team eliminated.

Galeno was a regular starter for the Vila do Conde side during the year, scoring eight goals in 35 appearances overall. His first goal in the top flight came on 26 August, opening a 1–1 draw at Tondela on the third matchday.

Braga
On 6 August 2019, Galeno joined Braga on a five-year deal. The transfer fee was €3.5 million to be paid in instalments, plus value-added tax to take the fee to €4.3 million; the buyout clause of €15 million meant that Porto retained 50% of his economic rights.

Galeno scored his first goal in the third game of the league season, opening the score after six minutes in a 1–1 draw at Gil Vicente on 25 August 2019. On 3 November, he scored twice in as many minutes in a home game against neighbours Famalicão in a 2–2 draw. He played four games without scoring in the 2019–20 Taça da Liga, including the 1–0 final win over Sporting CP on 25 January. On 25 June 2020, he settled a 3–2 derby win over Vitória de Guimarães at the Estádio Municipal de Braga.

On 23 May 2021, Galeno was named the man of the match after Braga defeated Benfica 2–0 in the 2021 Taça de Portugal Final, to claim the cup competition for the third time in club history.

Galeno scored six goals in as many Europa League group games for Braga in 2021–22; this included two on 30 September in a 3–1 home win over Denmark's Midtjylland. In his final game on 22 January 2022, he scored a penalty to equalise in a 2–1 win at reigning champions Sporting.

Return to Porto 
On 31 January 2022, Porto reached an agreement to purchase Galeno for €9 million from Braga, on a contract until the summer of 2026. The buyout clause was €50 million. His first goal for the club came on 13 March in a 4–0 home win over Tondela, three minutes after coming on for Vitinha.

Personal life
In March 2022, Galeno was naturalised as a Portuguese citizen after five years of residence in the country.

Honours
Braga
Taça de Portugal: 2020–21
Taça da Liga: 2019–20

Porto
Primeira Liga: 2017–18,  2021–22
Taça de Portugal: 2021–22
Supertaça Cândido de Oliveira: 2022

Individual
Campeonato Goiano Best Newcomer: 2016
2021 Taça de Portugal Final: Man of the Match

References

External links
 Profile at the FC Porto website
 

1997 births
Living people
Sportspeople from Maranhão
Association football forwards
Brazilian footballers
Trindade Atlético Clube players
Primeira Liga players
Liga Portugal 2 players
FC Porto B players
FC Porto players
Portimonense S.C. players
Rio Ave F.C. players
S.C. Braga players
Brazilian expatriate footballers
Brazilian expatriate sportspeople in Portugal
Expatriate footballers in Portugal
Naturalised citizens of Portugal
Portuguese people of Brazilian descent